Ride Along 2 is a 2016 American buddy cop action comedy film directed by Tim Story and written by Phil Hay and Matt Manfredi. It is the sequel to the 2014 film Ride Along. The film stars Ice Cube, Kevin Hart, Ken Jeong, Benjamin Bratt, Olivia Munn, Bruce McGill and Tika Sumpter. Universal Pictures released the film on January 15, 2016. Like the original film, this sequel was panned by most critics but was a box office success, grossing $124.6 million worldwide during its theatrical run.

Plot
On crime lord Antonio Pope's boat, hacker A.J. is reviewing a list on the computer. Pope calls Port Commissioner Griffin, accusing him of stealing, which Griffin denies. Pope orders a hitman to eliminate the commissioner, then he tasks him to find who took his money.

Two years after the first movie, James is with partner Detective Mayfield, busting drug dealer Troy. He pulls a gun on James so Ben watching this over the camera, comes to help. He threatens Troy by acting tough, only to drop his badge. A shootout leads to Mayfield getting shot and Troy escaping. James and Ben chase him, and Ben nearly gets himself run over. James follows Troy through a parking garage, capturing him, and finding a necklace/flash drive on him.

Mayfield is hospitalized, and Lt. Brooks sends James to Miami to see who Troy was working for. Ben wants to go to prove he is ready for detective work, but nobody believes in him as he just caused such a mess.

At home, Ben begins to plan his and Angela's wedding, clashing with the wedding planner. Later, as Angela tries to seduce him, he complains about not being able to go to Miami. She calls James to get him to take Ben, both for him but also to get him out of her hair. Initially refusing, he changes his mind, thinking he can prove Ben is not detective material. They drive to Miami together.

Trying to use homicide detective Maya Cruz's computer without permission, she punishes Ben. Later, when they find A.J., he says a safe in a club contains something important, but first they have to meet someone there. At the club they find out the man is also Pope's hitman. A.J. creates a distraction to escape while James has a shoot-out with the hitman. Afterwards, with Maya they find the safe empty. Before they can take James' car, he realizes there is a bomb and it explodes.

Realizing he has A.J.'s phone, Ben contacts his girlfriend Tasha to locate him. He convinces her to cooperate by showing her that A.J.'s been hooking up with other women. When they find A.J., they bring him in on the investigation. He reveals that Pope is the real crook, despite his public image as an entrepreneur working with the new port commissioner, Nuñez. The team is at the home of Maya's friend/associate, Alonso, whom Ben accidentally shoots. Despite this, Alonso confirms that Pope is a crook.

James, Ben and Maya go to a party in Pope's mansion. Maya distracts him dancing while James and Ben gather info, with A.J.'s help. After narrowly escaping Marcus the alligator, Ben reconnects with the team. They get their information, but Pope catches them and knows they are cops, he lets them go. They use the information to locate a group of shipping trucks that may be carrying Pope's contraband. However, when they stop the first truck at the port, it's empty. Hernandez scolds them, as Pope shows up and acts angry for what the team did.

The team goes to a bar to go over what went wrong. Maya wonders why Nuñez showed up so fast at the port. When A.J. mentions Nuñez is on Pope's payroll, James realizes it was a decoy, and the real contraband is being brought in somewhere else at the port. James, Maya and A.J. go after Pope, but leave Ben handcuffed to a pole. He breaks free, going to Alonso's to remove the cuffs.

James, Maya and A.J. are at the port in the morning to catch Pope. Ben arrives to the shoot-out, exploding a container full of flammable barrels. Pope escapes in a truck, taking A.J. hostage. When James does not find Pope in the truck, Pope shoots at him, but Ben jumps in the way of the bullet. James shoots Pope a few times then, as Ben is wearing a bulletproof vest, he uses Ben as a human shield when he shoots again. Maya shoots Pope down.

James and Ben are commended for taking down Pope and Nuñez. They drive home in a yellow Lamborghini Maya got for them to take to Atlanta for the wedding. Ben and Angela get married and are ready to go off on a speed boat, but Ben asks James to make a speech. Reluctantly, he says that while Ben has gotten him into a lot of trouble since meeting, he has also saved his life, made Angela very happy, and helped him grow into a better man and cop. Ben and Angela then go on their boat ride, but Ben flies out of the boat when he hits a wake, amusing James.

Cast
 Ice Cube as James Payton 
 Kevin Hart as Ben Barber
 Ken Jeong as A.J. Jenkins
 Benjamin Bratt as Antonio Pope
 Olivia Munn as Detective Maya Cruz
 Carlos Gomez as Captain Hernandez
 Bruce McGill as Lieutenant Brooks
 Tika Sumpter as Angela Payton-Barber
 James Martin Kelly as Port Commissioner Griffin 
 Robert Pralgo as Port Commissioner Nunez 
 Glen Powell as Troy
 Sherri Shepherd as Cori
 Nadine Velazquez as Tasha
 Tyrese Gibson as Detective Mayfield
 Arturo Del Puerto as Alonso
 Michael Rose as The Hitter/Gates
 Utkarsh Ambudkar as Amir
 Bresha Webb as Shayla

Production

Development
On April 23, 2013, nine months prior to the first film's release, the studio announced that there would be a sequel to the film, with the script written by Phil Hay and Matt Manfredi. On February 18, 2014, it was announced that after the success of the first Ride Along film, Universal was moving forward with its sequel, with Tim Story returning to direct. Ice Cube and Hart were set to reprise their roles, Phil Hay and Matt Manfredi finalized the script, and production was set to start in late June or early July 2014. Benjamin Bratt joined the film's cast, and Variety stated that this installment would have its two stars traveling to Miami for fun, chaos, and shenanigans. On July 16, Glen Powell joined the cast of the film. On July 28, Sherri Shepherd joined the cast.

Filming
Principal photography on the film began on July 7, 2014 in Miami, Florida. After a week of shooting in Miami, production shifted to Fort Lauderdale, Florida on July 14, where they filmed through July 21. Then filming took place in Miami again, through the end of July, and then production moved to Atlanta, where the first part of the film was shot. In Atlanta, after preparations began on July 24 for filming scenes at 55 Park Place, filming started on July 28, and was shot at 55 Park Place through August 4. Principal photography ended on September 16, 2014.

Release
On March 13, 2014, Universal set the film's release date as January 15, 2016. The first official trailer for Ride Along 2 was released on August 13, 2015, and was attached to screenings of Universal's Straight Outta Compton.

Home media
Ride Along 2 was released on DVD and Blu-ray on April 26, 2016.

Reception

Box office
Ride Along 2 grossed $90.9 million in North America and $33.4 million in other territories, for a worldwide total of $124.3 million, against a budget of $40 million.

The film was released in North America on January 15, 2016, alongside 13 Hours: The Secret Soldiers of Benghazi and Norm of the North. The film was projected to gross $40–45 million over the four-day Martin Luther King Jr. weekend, and become the first film to overtake Star Wars: The Force Awakens for number one at the weekend box office. The film made $1.3 million from its Thursday night previews, improving on the $1.1 million of the original. Ride Along 2 went on to gross $35.2 million in its opening weekend and $41 million for the four-day MLK Holiday weekend, lower than its predecessor's $48.6 million four-day MLK Holiday opening two years prior, but still finished first at the box office. The film fell 64.7% to $12.4 million in its second weekend, compared to the 48% sophomore drop of the first film.

Critical response
On Rotten Tomatoes the film has an approval rating of 14% based on 121 reviews, with an average rating of 3.90/10. The site's critical consensus reads, "Ride Along 2 presents a cop-comedy sequel whose well-matched stars can't break the law of diminishing returns -- or lock up a script that unabashedly steals from the original." On Metacritic, the film has a weighted average score of 32 out of 100, based on 29 critics, indicating "generally unfavorable reviews". Audiences polled by CinemaScore gave the film an average grade of "B+" on an A+ to F scale, while PostTrak reported filmgoers gave it an 80% overall positive score and a 57% "definite recommend".

Justin Chang of Variety magazine called it "Another tired, witless and potentially lucrative attempt to spin an exhausted buddy-cop template into action-comedy gold."

Accolades

Planned sequel 
In October 2016, Tim Story, who directed the first two films, announced that a third film is currently in development with Ice Cube and Kevin Hart set to reprise their roles.

References

External links
 
 
 

2016 films
2016 action comedy films
American action comedy films
American sequel films
American buddy comedy films
American buddy cop films
Films directed by Tim Story
Films produced by Ice Cube
Films produced by Will Packer
Films scored by Christopher Lennertz
Films set in Atlanta
Films set in Miami
Films shot in Atlanta
Films shot in Miami
2010s police comedy films
2010s road movies
American road movies
Cube Vision films
Will Packer Productions films
Universal Pictures films
African-American comedy films
2010s buddy cop films
Films with screenplays by Phil Hay (screenwriter)
Films with screenplays by Matt Manfredi
2010s English-language films
2010s American films
African-American films